The 2016 World Match Racing Tour was a series of match racing sailing regattas staged during 2016 season.

Phil Robertson won the tour by winning the last event in Marstrand, Sweden.

Regattas

References

2016
2016 in sailing